The Microsoft Mouse is a computer mouse released by Microsoft in 1983. It is the first mouse released by the company, and it was bundled with Microsoft Word, Notepad, and an on-screen teaching tutorial for an initial price of $195.

Nicknamed the "green-eyed mouse", the Microsoft Mouse featured a pair of green buttons. It also featured a more curved body than the blockier designs more common of mice at the time. As with other mice at the time, the Microsoft Mouse used a steel ball for tracking.

The initial version featured an InPort ISA interface, requiring a Microsoft bus card to be installed in the computer. Later versions were available with DE-9 or DB-25 serial connectors. All versions of the Microsoft Mouse could be used with IBM-compatible and other DOS systems.

Later Microsoft mice
In 1985 Microsoft introduced the "gray-eyed" Microsoft Mouse, featuring a higher resolution than competing mice. In 1987 the "dove bar" Microsoft Mouse (so called for the curved palm rest's resemblance to a Dove soap bar) was introduced, compatible with both serial port and PS/2 port. In 1991 a ballpoint Microsoft Mouse was made. The "kidney" Microsoft Mouse 2.0 was introduced in 1993, and its design served as the basis for the IntelliMouse, which debuted in 1996.

More Microsoft mice have been released in later years, including Microsoft Natural Wireless Laser Mouse, Microsoft SideWinder, Arc Mouse, Microsoft Sculpt Ergonomic Mouse and others.

References

Further reading
  (NB. Has various information how to detect different mouse types.)

Computer mice
Microsoft
Microsoft hardware
Microsoft peripherals